Gillellus inescatus, the flagfin stargazer, is a species of tropical sand stargazer native to the Caribbean sea.

Etymology
The specific epithet "inescatus" is derived from the Latin word "inescare" (to bait). It refers to the structure at the back of the head and front of the spine, shaped like an anglerfish's esca, which Williams theorizes may be used as bait for luring prey, in a style similar to anglerfish, or as a means to attract potential mates. The species' common name, "flagfin stargazer" refers to the structure's resemblance to a small flag atop the blenny's spine.

Description
Its body is elongate and compressed, primarily creamy-white, with eight reddish-brown saddles and blue chromatophores on the head. The esca-like structure is at the tip of the elongated spine on the first dorsal fin and is reddish brown. Williams describes G. inescatus as being similar to G. uranidea, G. healae, and G. jacksoni, with the esca being a noticeable distinguishing trait.

Distribution
The full extent of the distribution of Gillellus inescatus is uncertain, as it is only known from the holotype specimen, found between Northwest Point and Lulu Bay, Navassa Island.

References

inescatus
Fish described in 2002
Fauna of Haiti
Fish of the Caribbean